Sir Thomas Cornwall (1468–1537) was the 8th feudal baron of Burford.  He was knighted in 1497.

He was born the son of Sir Edmund Cornwall of Burford, Shropshire. He succeeded his father in 1489, was knighted at the Battle of Blackheath in 1497, and made a knight banneret in 1513.

He was appointed High Sheriff of Herefordshire for 1502–03 and 1514–15 and High Sheriff of Shropshire for 1505–06, 1515–16, 1519–20 and 1531–32. He represented Shropshire at the Field of the Cloth of Gold in 1520.

He was a Member (MP) of the Parliament of England for Shropshire in 1529.

He married Anne, the daughter of Sir Richard Corbet of Moreton Corbet; they had two sons and three daughters. Their son Richard also became an MP and sheriff .
Married 2. Margaret  Clifford  
ISSUES= Laurence Cornell

Notes

References

1470s births
1537 deaths
Politicians from Shropshire
English MPs 1529–1536
High Sheriffs of Herefordshire
High Sheriffs of Shropshire
Knights banneret of England